Cao is a Vietnamese surname. The name is transliterated as Gao in Chinese and Go in Korean. It is unrelated to the Chinese surname Cao, which is transliterated as Tào in Vietnamese.

List of persons with the surname

 Cao Lỗ, weaponry engineer and minister
 Cao Bá Quát, poet and revolutionary
 Cao Thắng, bandit-turned-anticolonial fighter
 Cao Xuân Dục, scholar, historian-mandarin, and court adviser
 Cao Văn Lầu,  musician
 Cao Văn Viên, General in the Army of the Republic of Vietnam (ARVN)
 Đoan Trang (Cao Thị Đoan Trang), singer
 Joseph Cao, lawyer, former US representative from Louisiana

Vietnamese-language surnames